Bad Boy is an American alternative sport and lifestyle brand. They are notable for their presence in both fashion and performance equipment.

About 

Bad Boy provides action sport and combat sport athletes with performance products and apparel. Marcus first began producing T-shirts and shorts for local surfers, skaters and motocross riders in San Diego, CA in the early eighties. In the nineties, Bad Boy launched a combat sports line, starting with their sponsorship of Rickson Gracie, son of the founder of Brazilian Jiu Jitsu, Helio Gracie, for a seminar that he was giving in Rio de Janeiro. The seminar made the cover story in a national magazine and the cover photo featured Rickson wearing a Bad Boy gi. As Jiu Jitsu continued to grow in Brazil, Bad Boy continued to sponsor both the Gracies and Jiu Jitsu tournaments.

Other martial art academies in Brazil, most notably Luta Livre, took notice of the success and popularity of Jiu Jitsu and a war of words began, wherein Jiu Jitsu was denounced as a fad and not as effective as was publicized. In order to settle the debate, the first Mixed Martial Arts tournaments, then called Vale Tudo, sprung up throughout Brazil and Bad Boy was first in line to support the sport.

As the sport grew, it became apparent that the gi and traditional gear were hindering the performance of many athletes. Bad Boy recognized this and created the first shorts designed for the needs of Vale Tudo fighters. The Vale Tudo (VT) shorts were based on the Sungão, which is the Brazilian word for the swim briefs favored on Brazil’s beaches. Bad Boy added legs to the garment and were made of durable yet comfortable polyamide.

The Bad Boy branding is currently represented in the EU by https://web.archive.org/web/20161010125026/https://badboy.com/gb/en_gb/ selling MMA equipment and fight wear.

Bad Boy has won Best Technical Clothing Brand in the 2010 and 2011 World MMA Awards, and Best Lifestyle Clothing Brand in 2012.

Historic fighters, trainers, and coaches

 Alexander Gustafsson
 Vitor Belfort
 Antônio Rogério Nogueira
 Antônio Rodrigo Nogueira
 Shogun Rua
 Joachim Hansen
 Mark Kerr
 Dan Henderson
 Frank Shamrock
 Ricardo Arona
 Wallid Ismail
 Rickson Gracie
 Renzo Gracie
 Mark Coleman
 Martin Kampmann
 Paulo Thiago
 Jake Shields
 Pedro Rizzo
 Bob Sapp
 Jerome Le Banner
 Dean Lister
 Wesley Correira
 Saulo Ribeiro
 Diego Sanchez
 Lyoto Machida
 Junior dos Santos
 Nino Schembri
 Jorge “Macaco” Patino
 Chris Weidman
 Kelvin Gastelum
 Stephen Thompson
 Michael Page

Bad Boy Apparel

See also
Mixed martial arts clothing

References

External links
 

Manufacturing companies based in San Diego
Clothing companies of the United States
Sporting goods manufacturers of the United States
Sportswear brands